I'm A Vagabond is a 2010 single by Andrew W.K. that was featured on the album Mother of Mankind. The song originally premiered on April 6, 2006 on a radio program called “Jonesy’s Jukebox”. He intended for the song to be on his album Close Calls with Brick Walls but it never was. The song that appeared on the radio program was not finished and Andrew stated that "there would be more versions to follow".
The final song premiered on a radio show called “East Village Radio”. The song was released on the Big Scary Monsters record label on a square 7" limited to 500 copies worldwide with two songs that ended up on the re-release of Close Calls with Brick Walls. The first 100 copies came with a hand-written note from Andrew himself, including a link to download free MP3s of the three songs included on the single.
A music video for the song was released on March 13, 2010.

Track listing
Side A
"I'm A Vagabond" - 2:43
"Doing Andrew W.K." - 1:22
Side B
"Let's Go On A Date" - 2:19

References

2010 singles
Andrew W.K. songs
2010 songs